Olberdam de Oliveira Serra (born 6 February 1985 in João Pessoa, Paraíba), known simply as Olberdam, is a Brazilian former professional footballer who played as a central midfielder.

Football career
After starting his professional career with lowly Mogi Mirim Esporte Clube and Corinthians Alagoano, Olberdam moved abroad and joined Portuguese Primeira Liga club C.S. Marítimo in the middle of 2005, aged 20. He scored once in his first season, in a 2–0 home win over neighbours C.D. Nacional on 16 April 2006, but played only eight league matches.

In the following three years, Olberdam continued to be regularly used by the Madeira side, amassing a further 66 games and netting two goals. On 2 February 2010, he was loaned to league leaders S.C. Braga until June as the team had just lost to a hefty suspension another player in the position, compatriot Vandinho; he helped with three appearances for an eventual best-ever second-place finish.

In July 2010, Olberdam returned to his country, signing with Club Athletico Paranaense on loan. In the following transfer window, he joined FC Rapid București from Romania in the same situation.

References

External links

1985 births
Living people
People from João Pessoa, Paraíba
Brazilian footballers
Association football midfielders
Campeonato Brasileiro Série A players
Mogi Mirim Esporte Clube players
Sport Club Corinthians Alagoano players
Club Athletico Paranaense players
Primeira Liga players
Segunda Divisão players
C.S. Marítimo players
S.C. Braga players
Liga I players
FC Rapid București players
CS Concordia Chiajna players
Brazilian expatriate footballers
Expatriate footballers in Portugal
Expatriate footballers in Romania
Brazilian expatriate sportspeople in Portugal
Brazilian expatriate sportspeople in Romania
Sportspeople from Paraíba